Amar may refer to:

People

Given name
 Amar (British singer) (born 1982), British Indian singer born Amar Dhanjal
 Amar (Lebanese singer) (born 1986), born Amar Mahmoud Al Tahech
 Amar Bose (1929–2013), Founder of Bose Corporation
 Amar Gupta (born 1953), Indian computer scientist 
Amar Gegić, Bosnian basketball player
 Amar Khan, Pakistani director, writer and television actress
 Amar Mehta (born 1990), Indian figure skater
 Amar Singh (general) ( 13th century), military general of Brahmachal
 Amar Singh Thapa (1751–1816), Nepalese Badakaji
 Amar Singh Thapa (sardar) (1759–1814), Nepalese General
 Amar Talwar (born 1949), Bollywood and Television actor
 Amar Upadhyay (born 1972), Indian Television actor

Surname
 Akhil Amar (born 1958), American professor of law at Yale
 David Amar (1920–2000), Moroccan Jewish businessman
 Jean-Pierre-André Amar (1755–1816), politician in the French Revolution
 Jo Amar (1930–2009), Moroccan-Israeli singer
 Larry Amar (1972–2020), American field hockey player
 Ludu Daw Amar (1915–2008), Burmese writer from Mandalay
 Shlomo Amar (born 1948), the Sephardi Chief Rabbi of Israel
 Vikram Amar (born  1963), American professor of law at UC Davis

Places
 Amar, India, a village in Gujarat
 Amar al-Husn, a village in Homs Governorate, Syria
 Amar (1), Kerman, a village in Iran
 Amar (2), Kerman, a village in Iran
 Amar (3), Kerman, a village in Iran
 Amar, Lorestan, or Ammar, a village in Iran

Entertainment
 Amar (1954 film), a Hindi-language Indian film
 Amar (2017 film), a Spanish film
 Amar (2019 film), a Kannada-language Indian film
 "Amar" (song), a song by 2B, which represented Portugal in the Eurovision Song Contest 2005
 Amar, a Klingon battlecruiser in Star Trek: The Motion Picture

See also
 Ammar (name)
 Ammar (disambiguation)
 Amarnath (disambiguation)

Masculine given names